The Kokokulunggur   are an indigenous Australian people of North Queensland.

Country
Their inland extension was around Mount Carbine.

History of contact
Cook Sailed past the Kokokulunggur in 1770 before being wreaked near Cooktown, and there was later some conflict between the Kokokulunggur and early pastoralists.

Alternative names
 Koko-yalung.
 Ngarlkajee. (Wakara exonym).

Notes

Citations

Sources

Aboriginal peoples of Queensland